Eelco Horsten (born 31 December 1989) is a Dutch former professional footballer, who played as a right back. He played for Roda JC and UNA.

External links
 
  

Living people
1989 births
People from Veldhoven
Association football fullbacks
Dutch footballers
Roda JC Kerkrade players
VV UNA players
Eredivisie players
Derde Divisie players